The AIR Awards of 2013 (or Carlton Dry Independent Music Awards of 2013) is the eighth annual Australian Independent Record Labels Association Music Awards (generally known as the AIR Awards) and was an award ceremony at Revolt Art Space, in Melbourne, Australia, on 9 October 2013. The event was sponsored by Australian brewing company, Carlton Dry.

In 2013, the award for Best Independent Classical Album was introduced, as was the Carlton Dry Global Music Grant; a $50,000 cash prize to an emerging independent artist or band in order to provide a major boost to their profile internationally, the finances designed to be used to give the winner a leg up in the international market. In a press release, the AIR said "The Carlton Dry Global Music Grant has been created to ensure that current and future generations of emerging Australian artists have the opportunity to take their music careers abroad. Conditions for entry are that the band or artist must be emerging, Australian, self released or released by an independent label, and that the prize money must be used exclusively to help tour, showcase, record, or relocate overseas to further their careers."

Performers
Perferormers at the ceremony were:
Violent Soho
Archie Roach
Big Scary
Rüfüs
Saskwatch
Seth Sentry

Nominees and winners
Winners are listed first and highlighted in boldface; other final nominees are listed alphabetically.

See also
Music of Australia

External links

References

2013 in Australian music
2013 music awards
AIR Awards